Lincolnshire Police is the territorial police force covering the non-metropolitan county of Lincolnshire in the East Midlands of England. Despite the name, the force's area does not include North East Lincolnshire and North Lincolnshire, which are covered by Humberside Police instead.

In terms of geographic area the force is one of the largest in the England and Wales covering 2,284 square miles. The population of the area covered by the force is 736,700.  As of 2010 the force currently employs over 2,500 people.  As at May 2016, there were 1,100 police officers, 200 Special Constables and 149 PCSOs.

History 
Lincolnshire Constabulary was formed in 1856 under the County and Borough Police Act 1856. Several other borough police forces used to exist in the county, but these were eventually combined with the Lincolnshire force.  Under the Police Act 1946, Boston Borough Police and Grantham Borough Police were merged, while Lincoln City Police and Grimsby Borough Police were absorbed under the Police Act 1964.  Lincolnshire lost part of its area to the new Humberside Police in 1974.

In 1965, the force had an establishment of 918 officers and an actual strength of 883.

Proposals made by the Home Secretary on 20 March 2006 would have seen the force merge with the other four East Midlands forces to form a strategic police force for the entire region. These proposals were ended by John Reid in June 2006. The police authority received £287,600 from the Home Office for costs of preparing the ill-fated merger.

In 2008 the Lincolnshire Police Authority experienced a funding crisis.  The authority claimed that the central government grant was insufficient to provide efficient policing in Lincolnshire, due to the unfavourable working of the formula used by the government to assess police grants.  The authority decided to reduce the shortfall by making a 79% increase in its precept (the portion of Council Tax payable to the Police Authority).  The government then announced its intention to "cap" this demand, resulting in a net 26% increase.

Chief constables 
 1856–1901: Captain Philip Bicknell
 1901–03: Major Charles Brinkley
 1903–31: Captain Cecil Mitchell-Innes, CBE, KPM
 1931–34: Colonel Gordon Herbert Ramsay Halland, CIE, OBE
 1934–54: Sir Raymond Hatherell Fooks, CBE, KPM
 1954–56: Herman Graham Rutherford
 1956–69: John William Barnett, OBE
 1970–73: George Walter Roberts Terry, QPM
 1973–77: Lawrence Byford, QPM
 1977–83: James Kerr, QPM
 1983–90: Stanley William Crump, QPM
 1990–94: Neville Gilbert Ovens, QPM
 1994–98: John Peter Bensley, QPM
 1998–2003: Richard John Nicholas Childs, QPM
 2003–08: James Anthony Lake, QPM
 2008–12: Richard Philip deJordan Crompton, QPM
 2012–17: Neil Rhodes
 2017–2020: William Alan Skelly, QPM
 2020present : Chris Haward

Alumni 
 Lawrence Byford (former Chief Constable) – father of Mark Byford
 Arthur Troop – police sergeant who started the International Police Association on 1 January 1950, with initial resistance from his superiors.

District structure
The Chief Constable is Chris Haward.
Lincolnshire Police has an establishment of about 1,100 police officers.  In 2011, the force underwent major changes to its organisation; divisions went and front line officers were organised into Neighbourhood Policing Teams (NPT) and Response (area cars). 
Previously there were three "divisions" (West, East, & South) with Lincoln, Skegness, and Grantham hosting the divisional headquarters of each.

The county is divided into four "districts" for the purposes of policing. These areas each effectively pair two district/borough council areas into one policing district, and are:
 Lincoln & West Lindsey (covering Lincoln, Gainsborough, and Market Rasen)
 North & South Kesteven (covering Grantham, Sleaford, North Hykeham, Bracebridge Heath, Market Deeping, Bourne and Stamford)
 Coast & Wolds (covering Skegness, Mablethorpe, Louth and Horncastle)
 Boston & South Holland (covering Boston, Spalding, Holbeach, and Sutton Bridge).

The force has armed response vehicles manned by Roads Policing Officers (RPU).

Officers from Lincolnshire are also detached to EMSOU, East Midlands Special Operations unit. The force has its own underwater search unit that consists of one part-time team of around ten officers and this unit is based permanently at the Lincolnshire Police Headquarters.

Other departments
As with all police forces, Lincolnshire Police has many specialist departments aside from the officers and PCSOs that respond initially to calls from the public. These include the Roads Armed Policing Team (who also form the force's Firearms and Traffic response), Dog section, Public Protection Unit (including specialist sexual offences officers), Scenes Of Crime, Custody suites, and the Force Control Room. In addition to this are other support departments such as IT and HR.

Officers and Police Staff forming these departments are based across the county, but most having their main office at Force Headquarters in Nettleham.

Lincolnshire Police operates a Special Constabulary that has approximately 200 officers from the rank of Special Constable to Special Superintendent. Officers are based throughout the county out of local police stations. Lincolnshire Special Constabulary also has offices deployed in specialist units such as wildlife crime and Safer Roads unit.

See also 
 Lincolnshire Police and Crime Commissioner
 List of law enforcement agencies in the United Kingdom, Crown Dependencies and British Overseas Territories
 Law enforcement in the United Kingdom

References

External links 

 
 Lincolnshire Police at HMICFRS

Police forces of England
Police
1856 establishments in England
Organizations established in 1856